USRC Walter Forward was a schooner constructed for service with the United States Revenue Marine. She was more commonly known as USRC Forward. Forward served with the U.S. Army and U.S. Navy in Mexican waters during the Mexican–American War and was commended for her actions during the Tabasco River landings by Commodore Matthew C. Perry, U.S. Navy. After the war, she was transferred to the U.S. Coast Survey for a short time as USCS Walter Forward before being returned to the Revenue Marine for service during the 1850s and the American Civil War.

Construction and commissioning
The cutter Forward was built in Washington, D.C. at a cost of 3,786.75 by William Easby with construction was supervised by Captain Henry Prince, Revenue Marine. Prince apparently captained Forward from 23 April 1842 to 18 April 1843. She was designed to enforce customs laws and to assist mariners in distress. Forward was named for Walter P. Forward, 15th United States Secretary of the Treasury

Early service
Forward was commissioned 23 June 1842 and was initially assigned patrol duties at Baltimore, Maryland. On 16 May 1846 she received orders to report to Philadelphia, Pennsylvania for repairs in preparation to being assigned duties with the U.S. Army and U.S. Navy during the Mexican–American War.

Mexican–American War operations

Service with the U.S. Army
She set sail for the gulf on 23 May 1846 in company with another cutter, USRC Ewing, and arrived at Southwest Pass of the Mississippi River on 19 June 1846. There, General Zachary Taylor ordered the ship to blockade a stretch of the Mexican coast near Soto la Marina and capture any ships engaged in trade with the enemy. The squadron that Forward was assigned to performed scouting, convoy, towing, and blockade duties as well transporting troops and supplies for the Army and occupied her during mid-summer 1846.

Service with the U.S. Navy
On 23 August 1846, she received orders to report to Commodore David Conner's naval squadron off Tampico, Mexico. Four days later, she entered the anchorage at Antón Lizardo and began patrolling off Tampico. That assignment lasted until 15 September 1846 when she received orders transferring her to the U.S. Navy under Commodore Conner at which time she moved farther down the coast to join the blockade of Veracruz. In mid-October 1846, she joined a force commanded by Commodore Matthew Calbraith Perry, U.S. Navy. On 15 October 1846, Perry's squadron attempted to cross the bar at the mouth of the river at Alvarado. The steamer  led the way and succeeded in making her crossing, Forward followed, in tow of sister revenue cutter, . McLane grounded on the bar while the three ships she towed fouled each other's towlines. Vixen engaged the Mexican batteries on shore but, when it became apparent that McLane would never succeed in getting across the bar, she and her tows retired. Luckily, McLane came off the bar, and all American ships retired. On 16 October Forward set sail for a similar, but far more successful, amphibious operation at the mouth of the Tabasco River. Successfully navigating the bar on 23 October 1846, the force quickly seized the town of Frontera and took several prizes in the process. Forward and the other small steamers attached to Perry's force then continued the foray, sailing  up the river through hostile territory to the town of Tabasco. Forward supplied part of her crew as a landing party along with Marines that were from USS Vixen and they captured the town of Tabasco. The flotilla seized 10 vessels as prizes before returning to the ocean on 26 October 1846. However, Forward along with McLane remained at Frontera until late November 1846, engaged in the destruction of the captured Mexican shipping and maintaining a blockade of the river. She departed the area on 21 November 1846 and returned to the base at Anton Lizardo on 21 November 1846. In December 1846, Forward left the Mexican coast to carry dispatches to Belize City in British Honduras and New Orleans, Louisiana. She returned to blockade duty on 7 February 1847 and took station off Veracruz once again on 9 February 1847. She continued routine blockade operations at various points along the eastern coast of Mexico until April 1847. On 15 April 1847, she received orders to set sail for Wilmington voyaging by way of New Orleans, and reached her destination on 23 May 1847. Repairs completed in the summer of 1847 after reaching Wilmington cost about 2,500. Forward received a commendation from Commodore Perry for her participation in the Tabasco River landings, where-in he said in part:

Transfer to the U.S. Coast Survey
On 30 October 1847, Forward was transferred to the United States Coast Survey. On 16 December the Revenue Marine traded the Coast Survey the newly commissioned steamer  for Forward. Forward returned to Revenue Marine service 6 March 1848 with a homeport of Wilmington.

1848–1861
On 6 January 1854 she was one of six Revenue Marine cutters stationed along the Atlantic coast ordered to search for the disabled steamer San Francisco in the vicinity of Bermuda. After failing to locate the vessel the search was called off 18 January. On 20 April 1856 she was sent to the Philadelphia Navy Yard for repairs with the repairs completed by 27 June. She returned to the yard on 21 October 1857 for additional repairs and was able to return to service at Wilmington 1 December. On 26 April 1861 she was ordered to Philadelphia to receive additional armament and to cooperate with the U.S. Navy.

American Civil War service
On 4 May 1861, she sailed for Annapolis, Maryland under the orders of General Benjamin F. Butler where she was tasked with keeping Chesapeake Bay open for troop transports from Perryville, Maryland to Annapolis and to "capture or sink any unfriendly craft, after taking out their crews". This duty proved difficult for the schooner to perform and the captain of Forward sometimes had to ask any passing steamers for a tow. On 20 July she sailed from Annapolis to Baltimore and was stationed at the mouth of Severn River on 31 August. On 1 October Forward was returned to Revenue Marine control and she returned to Philadelphia on 19 October for repairs before reporting to New York City, New York on 4 February 1862. On 20 February she resumed duties at Wilmington and remained there until ordered to assume blockade duties at Beaufort, North Carolina on 3 June. Forward arrived at Beaufort 27 June and was said to have remained there until 18 November 1865. However, on 31 January 1863, she assisted in extinguishing a fire which had broken out on the full-rigged ship Joseph Gilchrist at New York.

Post-war decommissioning and sale
Forward arrived at Baltimore on 29 November 1865 and was ordered de-commissioned and sold on 30 November for approximately $5,000.

See also
 Union blockade

Notes
Footnotes

Citations

References used

 
 
 
 
 
 
 
 

Ships of the United States Coast Guard
Ships built in the District of Columbia
Mexican–American War ships of the United States
Gunboats of the United States Navy
Ships of the Union Navy
Schooners of the United States Navy
1842 ships